Ken Rolston is an American computer game and role-playing game designer best known for his work with West End Games and on the computer game series The Elder Scrolls.  In February 2007, he elected to join the staff of computer games company Big Huge Games to create a new role-playing game.

Tabletop role-playing games
Ken Rolston began working as a professional games designer in 1982. Rolston spent twelve years as an award-winning designer of tabletop role-playing games. His credits include games and supplements for Paranoia, RuneQuest, Warhammer Fantasy Roleplay, Advanced Dungeons & Dragons, and Dungeons & Dragons.

Rolston was a Basic Role-Playing writer for Chaosium. Rolston had also done work for Chaosium's Stormbringer and Superworld lines. When Rolston was a new hire at West End Games in 1983, he became the fourth creator on Paranoia and was responsible for turning Greg Costikyan's dry rules into a highly atmospheric game, the results of which were published at GenCon in 1984. Rolston wrote a complete manuscript for a magic system for Games Workshop to use in their Warhammer Fantasy Roleplay RPG, but they rejected it; Rolston's manuscript circulated on the internet for years. Rolston left West End Games when Scott Palter decided to move the company from New York to rural Honesdale, Pennsylvania in 1988. Chaosium stopped writing material for RuneQuest at Avalon Hill in 1989, but RuneQuest returned in 1992 with Rolston as editor. Rolston's first publication as part of the "RuneQuest Renaissance" was Tales of the Reaching Moon contributor Michael O'Brien's Sun County (1992). In 1994, Avalon Hill dropped Rolston from their regular staff, relegating him to freelancer status; his last two manuscripts, Strangers in Prax and Lords of Terror saw print that year, but afterward, Rolston moved on to work for a multimedia company.

Rolston also was winner of the H. G. Wells Award for Best Role-playing Game, Paranoia, 1985, and served as role-playing director for West End Games, Games Workshop, and Avalon Hill Game Company.

In 2016, Rolston joined Mongoose Games to assist in editing their newest edition of Paranoia, which was Kickstarted in 2014, in order to "hit all the right notes for both veteran players and newbies alike."

Video game industry
Rolston was the lead designer for Bethesda's role-playing game, The Elder Scrolls III: Morrowind, its expansions and was also lead designer for The Elder Scrolls IV: Oblivion. He was lead designer for two Big Huge Games projects, both of which were canceled in 2009.

Rolston went on to be the lead creative visionary for Kingdoms of Amalur: Reckoning, a single player RPG designed by Big Huge Games, a Baltimore subsidiary of 38 Studios.

Selected works

References

External links
 

American video game designers
Bethesda Softworks employees
Board game designers
Chaosium game designers
Dungeons & Dragons game designers
Living people
New York University alumni
Warhammer Fantasy Roleplay game designers
Year of birth missing (living people)